Ioan-Gabriel Nan (born September 3, 1980) is an alpine skier from Romania.  He competed for Romania at the 2010 Winter Olympics.  His best result was a 49th place in the giant slalom.

References

External links

1980 births
Living people
Romanian male alpine skiers
Olympic alpine skiers of Romania
Alpine skiers at the 2010 Winter Olympics